Fellow Citizen is a 1983 Iranian documentary film directed by Abbas Kiarostami.

See also
List of Iranian films

External links

 

Films directed by Abbas Kiarostami
1983 films
1980s Persian-language films
Iranian documentary films
1983 documentary films